A .50 caliber handgun is a handgun firing a bullet measuring approximately  in diameter. Historically, many black powder pistols fired bullets with diameters well above a half inch. However, following the development of smokeless powder, the focus shifted to smaller-diameter bullets propelled at higher velocities, and the development of .50 and larger calibers in handguns became uncommon.

In the twentieth century, several new cartridges of half-inch diameter were developed, the first by John Linebaugh of Cody, Wyoming, in 1986 with the development of the .500 Linebaugh, and then later with the .50 Action Express (1988), which was the first to achieve wide popularity. The .500 Linebaugh utilizes a bore diameter of .500" with the corresponding bullet diameter of .510", the same as the .50 BMG and other .50 caliber rifles, while the .50 Action Express, .500 S&W Magnum, and .500 S&W Special use .490" bore diameters and correspondingly smaller .500" bullet diameters. The smaller .500" diameter was further popularized by the development of the .500 S&W Magnum in 2003.

There are semi-automatic, revolver, and single-shot .50 caliber handgun designs. Handguns of this caliber tend to be larger and heavier than most others of their type with the exception of the Linebaugh line of revolvers. The Linebaugh revolvers are based on the standard Ruger Blackhawk with Ruger Bisley grip frames, although the cylinders have been enlarged for both structural integrity and absorbing the recoil associated with firing these rounds as have the previously mentioned .500 handguns.

Despite being featured in many video games and action films as the weapon of choice for some members of elite military and law enforcement units, these guns in reality are used primarily for hunting, target shooting, and silhouette shooting.

Examples

.50 Action Express
Magnum Research Inc. Desert Eagle
Magnum Research BFR
Arcadia Machine & Tool AutoMag V
LAR Manufacturing Grizzly Mark V
Freedom Arms Model 555

.50 GI
Conversions for the Glock 20/Glock 21
Guncrafter Industries Model Nos. 1, 2, 3

500 GNR
Gary Reeder Custom Guns Ultimate 500

.500 S&W Magnum
Smith & Wesson Model 500
Taurus Raging Bull Model 500
Magnum Research BFR
JTL-E .500 S&W Magnum 12"
Gary Reeder Custom Guns Ultimate 500

Other
Ruger Bisley (.500 Linebaugh)
Magnum Research BFR (.50 Beowulf)
Freedom Arms Model 83 .500 WE (.500 Wyoming Express)
Triple Action Thunder (.50 BMG)
RSh-12 (12.7×55mm STs-130)
WTS .50 (.50 BMG)

See also
12 mm caliber
Pfeifer Zeliska .600 Nitro Express revolver
List of handgun cartridges

Notes

 
Handguns